Datteln Power Station (German: Kraftwerk Datteln) is a modern coal-fired thermal power station in Datteln, Recklinghausen, 12 km north of Dortmund, North Rhine-Westphalia, Germany. It comprises four units with a total capacity of approximately 1,419 MW gross. Units 1-3 were built between 1964 and 1969 and were decommissioned in 2014. A characteristic of this power station is the fact that the most recently built unit, Unit 4, does not have a waste gas flue. Instead, the desulphurised flue gases are expelled using the updraught from the existing  cooling tower. The power station is operated by Uniper.

The plant employs about 200 full-time workers and 300 external jobs.

History 
About 6,300 people participated in the construction of Unit 4.

Technology 
Unit 4 delivers also 1,000 GW·hth yearly of district heating in addition to power generation, a supply sufficient for 100'000 households in the Castrop-Rauxel and Dortmund-Bodelschwingh areas. Of Unit 4 1,052 MW net generation capacity, 413 MW are delivered to Deutsche Bahn grid, powering its railway system. The 50 Hz electricity is converted into 16.7 Hz frequency for the train system and fed to Deutsche Bahn's 110kV high-voltage grid.

The plant  area is separated in two sections, 11 ha (unit 1–3) on left side and 57 ha (unit 4) on the right side of the Dortmund–Ems Canal, which is used to deliver hard coal by barges. Closed conveyor belts then transport the fuel to the coal storage facility. Closed conveyor belts also take the coal to the coal bunker, from which it is ground to a fine powder using five coal pulverisers. The fine powder is dried using hot air and then blown into the combustion chamber. The turbines rotate at 3,000 revolutions per minute, as the generator. Mitsubishi Hitachi Power Systems supplied the steam generator. Alstom supplied the steam turbine set, the same 1,100 MW set planned for the scrapped Unit 6 at Staudinger power plant and a proposed Port of Antwerp power plant in Belgium.

Unit 4 is equipped with an advanced multi-step flue gas purification system, which eliminates nitrogen oxides, dust and sulphur from the flue gas. Nitrogen oxide is washed first followed by dust and finally sulphur.

Unit Information 
The Power Station consists of 4 units, of which only Unit 4 is operational.

External links

 Dispute over Datteln coal power plant
 7.6 Datteln 4 – a symbol for Germany’s misguided climate policy
 Permit for Germany’s newest coal-fired power plant was invalid, court rules

References

Coal-fired power stations in Germany
Buildings and structures in Recklinghausen (district)
Uniper